Leo Madigan (28 September 1939 – 25 July 2015) was a New Zealand author who settled in Fátima, Portugal.

Early life and education 
Madigan attended Saint Thomas' preparatory school in Naenae, Lower Hutt, New Zealand, run by the Sisters of Mercy, and the Sacred Heart secondary school in Auckland, run by the Marist Brothers. He went to sea as Catering Boy, MV Wendover, London, in 1956. From 1958–1960 he was a novitiate with the Trappist religious order (Order of Cistercians of the Strict Observance).

Career
After work as a psychiatric nurse and a short spell in the Royal Horse Guards, Madigan appeared in minor roles on the London stage in 1963. From 1964–75 he was a rating in the British Merchant Navy.

Madigan then attended Sidney Webb College and was awarded the BEd degree of the University of London in 1978. From 1979–81 he worked in the educational arm of The Marine Society, edited The Seafarer magazine and taught at Gravesend Sea School. He taught at Fatih Lisesi (Fatih High School) in İzmir, Turkey from 1981–82. He sailed to the Falkland Islands on MV Uganda for the Marine Society in 1982 before teaching in the London Borough of Tower Hamlets from 1983–88.

In 1988, Madigan moved to Fuseta, in Algarve, Portugal, where he worked as a local journalist and published several books. He moved to the world-famous Marian apparitions city of Fátima, Portugal, in 1998, where he has published extensively about the Shrine (the Sanctuary of Our Lady of Fátima), about Blessed Alexandrina of Balazar and other Catholic-oriented works.

Bibliography

Non Fiction
Madigan has written short articles for The Seafarer, Blackwood's Magazine, Fairplay International Shipping Weekly and Catholic Life in the UK, Soul in the US and many English language publications in Portugal. His full-length works are:
 Random Jottings for Young Seafarers. 1978. Marine Society
 Safe or Sorry. 1980. Marine Society 
 The Devil is a Jackass. 1996. Gracewing. (UK). 
 The Catholic Quiz Book. 1996. Gracewing. (UK). 
 The Fatima Handbook. 2000. Gracewing. (UK). 
 What Happened at Fatima. 2000. CTS. (UK). ; Fatima-Ophel. 2000. (Portugal). 
 Princesses of the Kingdom. 2001. Kolbe. (Cork, Ireland). ; 2003. Fatima-Ophel. (Portugal).  
 The Children of Fatima. 2003. Our Sunday Visitor. (USA). 
 Why Fátima? 2004. Fatima-Ophel. (Portugal). 
 Armchair Fátima. 2005. Fatima-Ophel. (Portugal). 
 Alexandrina da Costa. 2005. Fatima-Ophel. (Portugal). 
 The 2nd Catholic Quiz Book. 2006. Fatima-Ophel. (Portugal). 
 The Fatima Guide. 2007. Fatima-Ophel. (Portugal). 
 The Irish Monstrance. 2009. Fatima-Ophel. (Portugal). 
 Exquisite Miniature. 2011. Fatima-Ophel. (Portugal). 
 The Golden Book of Fatima. 2013. Fatima-Ophel. (Portugal). 
 The Fatima Prayer Book. 2014 (9th printing). Fatima-Ophel. (Portugal).

Fiction
In addition to short stories appearing in The Seafarer and East End Magazine in the UK and The Algarve Magazine in Portugal, Madigan has written the following full length fictional works:
 Jackarandy. 1972. Elek. (UK), Quartet, 1974, 
 The Bank of Infinite Reserves. 1987. Fatima-Ophel. (Portugal). 
 The Weka-Feather Cloak. Bethlehem Books. (USA) 2002. 
 Who Told You You Were Naked? Fatima-Orphel. (Portugal) 2008. 
 Crystal Ball Cameos Fatima Books. 2014.

Prizes and awards
 Jackarandy
  Arts Council Award 1974
 The Will of Quintus Kirkwood
 2nd prize Yeovil Short Story Competition 2010
 shortlisted for Fountane Book Publishing 2010 competition
 1st prize Dream Quest Writing Competition, Chicago, Il. USA 2010
 (as Where There's a Will), 1st prize Moyama Competition 2010; Published in Moyama Annual Review 2011
 (as Where There's a Will), 2nd place Calderdale Short Story Competition 2011
 Those Gorgeous Ghosts (as Brighter Than New Coins)
 1st prize Chudleigh Phoenix 2012 Short Story Competition
 The Bogus Confession
 (as The Old Man From the Garden), Ashby de la Zouch Writers' Club 2010; 3rd place
 3rd prize, Deddington Writing Competition 2011
 The Seduction of Fausto Batista
 shortlisted, New Writer prose prize 2010.  2nd place
 The Kambala Buffaloes
 University of Plymouth Press Short Story Competition 2011
 Eric Hoffer Awards finalist; published in Best New Writing 2013, Hopewell Publication, New Jersey, USA
 2nd place William van Dyke Short Story Prize 2011
 1st runner-up Colonnade Writing Contest 2011
 The Protest of Able
 Highly Commended in The New Writer 2011 Prose & Poetry Prizes, Cranbrook UK
 The Siberian Swimmer
 Runner-up for The Fulton Prize, Adirondack Review 2011
 The Other Two
 1st prize, The Write Helper Story Contest 2011

References

Interview: EWTN Bookmark – 2012-06-10 –

External links
 Leo Madigan Books official website
 Leo Madigan Books on iBooks

Christian writers
New Zealand writers
People from Nelson, New Zealand
1939 births
Living people